The AACTA Award for Best Children's Television Animation is a television award handed out by the Australian Academy of Cinema and Television Arts (AACTA) since 2009. It is awarded to a "children's drama series, a children's mini series, a long children's telefeature or a short children's telefeature which is created using animation". The award is presented to the producer(s) of the animated program.

Winners and nominees
In the following table, winners are listed first, in boldface and highlighted in gold; those listed below the winner that are not in boldface or highlighted are the nominees.

See also
AACTA Awards

References
General

Specific

External links
The Australian Academy of Cinema and Television Arts Official website

AACTA Awards
Children's television awards